Hwang Inn-choon (born 26 September 1974) is a professional golfer from South Korea. He turned professional in 2002 at the age of 27.

Professional career
Hwang plays primarily on the Korean Tour, full-time since 2003, picking up three victories in 2007 and 2008. He won his first title on the Asian Tour at the GS Caltex Maekyung Open with a playoff win over Noh Seung-yul in Seoul. The win did not count towards the Order of Merit because he did not play in the minimum number of events to get his tour card. He currently plays on the Korean Tour and plays in a select few of events on the Asian Tour. He won the 2017 Hyundai Insurance KJ Choi Invitational on the Korean Tour and in 2019 finished runner-up in the Kolon Korea Open to earn a place in the 2019 Open Championship.

Professional wins (5)

Asian Tour wins (1)

1Co-sanctioned by the Korean Tour

Asian Tour playoff record (1–0)

Korean Tour wins (5)

1Co-sanctioned by the Asian Tour

Results in major championships

"T" indicates a tie for a place

References

External links

South Korean male golfers
Asian Tour golfers
Golfers from Seoul
1974 births
Living people